Queens of the Stone Age is an American rock band from Palm Desert, California, formed in 1997. The band frequently changes its line-up, and its records often include guest appearances. The only permanent member of the band is founder Josh Homme, with guitarist Troy Van Leeuwen having been a member since the release of the band's third studio album, Songs for the Deaf, in 2002. Bassist Michael Shuman and keyboardist and guitarist Dean Fertita both joined the band in 2007 to tour in support of its fifth studio album, Era Vulgaris (2007). In 2013, Queens of the Stone Age added drummer Jon Theodore during the recording of the album ...Like Clockwork (2013).

Current members

Former members 
{| class="wikitable"
!Images
!Name
!Time active
!Live instruments
!Other Studio instruments
!Release contributions
|-
|
|Alfredo Hernández
|1998–1999
| colspan="2" rowspan="2" |drums
|Queens of the Stone Age (1998)
|-
|
|Gene Trautmann
|1999–2001
|
|-
|
|Nick Oliveri
|
| colspan="2" |
|
|-
|
|Mark Lanegan
|
|lead and backing vocals
|keyboards in 2005
|Rated R (2000), Songs for the Deaf (2002), Lullabies to Paralyze (2005), Era Vulgaris (2007), ...Like Clockwork (2013)
|-
|
|Dave Grohl
|
| rowspan="2" |
|
|
|-
|
|Joey Castillo
|2002–2012
|piano
|
|-
|
|Alain Johannes{{efn|Johannes has been a close collaborator of the band since 2000, initially co-producing three of Rated R'''s B-sides, under the moniker "The Exotic Pets", with Josh Homme. Johannes subsequently appeared on Songs for the Deaf, performing on four of the album's tracks, and made significant contributions to Lullabies to Paralyze, following Nick Oliveri's departure. Johannes toured with the band throughout 2005, appearing on the live album, Over the Years and Through the Woods, and recorded both guitar and bass on Era Vulgaris. Johannes is credited with providing "additional engineering" on ...Like Clockwork, and is also a live member of Homme's side-project, Them Crooked Vultures.}}
|
|
|various instruments
|
|-
|
|Natasha Shneider
|
| colspan="2" |
|
|}

Timeline

Contributors

Guitarists
 John McBain – Made live appearances with the band in 1997 and co-wrote "Regular John".
 Dave Catching – Contributed guitar, lap steel and keyboards, has also been featured on the first four albums. (1998–2000)
 Mario Lalli – Filled in for Dave Catching who was touring in Europe with earthlings? between April 10 and May 14, 1999.
 Chris Goss – A long time collaborator with the band throughout their career, contributing on every album previous to ...Like Clockwork with various instruments, mainly guitars, and co-producing Rated R and Era Vulgaris together with Josh Homme as the Fififf Teeners. Has also made several live appearances throughout the band's career.
 Brendon McNichol – Replaced Dave Catching playing guitar, lap steel and keyboards during live performances and also recorded parts of Songs for the Deaf before leaving the band. (2000–2002)
 Dean Ween (aka Mickey Melchiondo) – Played guitar and provided backing vocals during the recording of Songs for the Deaf.
 Billy Gibbons – Recorded "Burn the Witch", as well as the bonus tracks, "Precious and Grace" and "Like a Drug" for Lullabies to Paralyze. Also made live appearances in 2005 which can be seen in the bonus footage on the Over the Years and Through the Woods DVD.
 Aaron North – Made guest appearances with the band at various performances in 2005.
 Lindsey Buckingham – Played guitar on My God Is the Sun live at the Grammy Awards in January 2014.

Bassists
 Van Conner – Performed on the Gamma Ray EP and the Kyuss/Queens of the Stone Age split EP and played live with the band from 1997 to 1998.
 Mike Johnson – Performed with the band on their first ever shows in 1997 and was credited for sitting on a sofa during the recording of the self-titled record and provided backing vocals on the track "Leg of Lamb" on Rated R.
 Milo Beenhakker – Performed on the track "18 A.D" which appeared on the Burn One Up! album in 1997.
 Dan Druff – Was a longtime guitar tech for Queens since Rated R. After Oliveri's departure from the band in 2004, Dan Druff briefly joined the touring line up playing bass and guitar.

Drummers/Percussionists
 Victor Indrizzo – Recorded on the Kyuss/Queens of the Stone Age split and the Gamma Ray EP.
 Matt Cameron – Recorded on "Born to Hula" on the Kyuss/Queens of the Stone Age split and played drums during live appearances in 1997 and 2008.
 Eva Nahon – Recorded drums for the track "18 A.D" which appeared on the Burn One Up! album in 1997.
 Nick Lucero – Played drums on six tracks and percussion on two tracks in session during the recording of Rated R.
 Barrett Martin – Recorded percussion on two tracks and vibes on two tracks as well as steel drums on one track on Rated R.

Keyboardists
 Hutch – Queens sound engineer since its inception in 1998. Also recorded piano for "I Was a Teenage Hand Model" from their self-titled album.
 Elton John – Recorded piano and vocals on the track, "Fairweather Friends", on ...Like Clockwork.
 Trent Reznor – Played keys on My God Is the Sun live at the Grammy Awards in January 2014 and produced the bonus track "Era Vulgaris" from the album of the same name as well as contributing vocals and drum programming on "Kalopsia" and background vocals on "Fairweather Friends" from ...Like Clockwork.

Vocalists

 Blag Dahlia – Lead vocals on "Punk Rock Caveman Living in a Prehistoric Age" in San Francisco in 2000.
 Tobey Torres – Backing vocals on "Quick and to the Pointless" at Reading Festival 2001.
 John Garcia – contributed backing vocals to 1997's "Kyuss/Queens of the Stone Age" split EP and made a live appearance on December 20, 2005, performing Kyuss songs with the band.
 Wendy Ray Moan – Contributed backing vocals to the tracks, "Feel Good Hit of the Summer" and "Quick and to the Pointless", on Rated R.
 Nick Eldorado – Contributed backing vocals to the tracks, "Feel Good Hit of the Summer" and "Quick and to the Pointless", on Rated R.
 Rob Halford – Contributed backing vocals to the track, "Feel Good Hit of the Summer", on Rated R.
 Pete Stahl – Contributed backing vocals to the track, "Lost Art of Keeping A Secret", on Rated R, and the B-sides, "Ode to Clarissa" and "Born to Hula". Stahl also toured with the band from 1998 to 1999 to perform backing vocals on various songs and performed lead vocals on Desert Sessions songs that were played, including "Cake (Who Shit in The?)" and "At the Helm of Hells Ships". He made a further live appearance on September 25, 2000, to perform "Nova".
 Brody Dalle – Contributed backing vocals to two of the band's studio albums: Lullabies to Paralyze and Era Vulgaris. Also appeared live with Queens to sing lead and backing vocals at the tribute concert for Natasha Shneider in 2008.
 Shirley Manson – Contributed backing vocals to the track, "You Got a Killer Scene There, Man...", on Lullabies to Paralyze.
 Julian Casablancas – provided backing vocals to "Sick, Sick, Sick" on Era Vulgaris, and played casio guitar on the same track. Also appeared at the Pearl Jam Twenty Festival in 2011 to sing on "Sick, Sick, Sick".
 Serrina Sims – Contributed backing vocals to the track "Make It wit Chu" on Era Vulgaris. Also sang backing vocals at the tribute concert for Natasha Shneider in 2008.
 Liam Lynch – Contributed backing vocals to the track, "Make It wit Chu" on Era Vulgaris.
 PJ Harvey – Vocals on several songs from Desert Sessions Volumes 9 & 10, vocalist on "Make it wit Chu" and one of her own songs at the tribute concert for Natasha Shneider in 2008.
 Jesse Hughes – Backing vocals on "Make it wit Chu" and lead vocals on Eagles of Death Metal song "Speaking in Tongues" at the tribute concert for Natasha Shneider in 2008.
 Bobby Gillespie – Sang lead vocals on the Brian Eno cover Needles in the Camel's Eye, which is the B-side to Make it Wit Chu. Trent Reznor – Co-wrote the bonus track, "Era Vulgaris", and contributed backing vocals to the songs "Kalopsia" and "Fairweather Friends" on ...Like Clockwork.
 Eddie Vedder – Backing vocals and cowbell on "Little Sister" at the Pearl Jam Twenty Festival in 2011 and at Lollapalooza Chile in 2013.
 Alex Turner – Contributed backing vocals to the track, "If I Had a Tail", on ...Like Clockwork, and co-wrote the lyrics to "Kalopsia" on the same album.
 Jake Shears – Provided co-lead vocals to the track, "Keep Your Eyes Peeled", on ...Like Clockwork''.
 Nikka Costa – Contributed backing vocals on Villains. 
 Matt Sweeney – Contributed backing vocals on Villains. 
 Fred Martin – Contributed backing vocals on Villains. 
 Tai Phillips – Contributed backing vocals on Villains. 
 Faith Matovia – Contributed backing vocals on Villains.

Lineups

References

External links 

 qotsa.com – official QOTSA site (Flash required)
 thefade.net – revamped version of old QOTSA fansite

 
Queens of the Stone Age